The following is a list of ships that were operated by CP Ships or its predecessor companies, Canadian Pacific Railway and Canadian Pacific Steamships Ocean Services Ltd.

In 1971, the company changed its name to CP Ships Ltd. Container ships were added to the fleet in response to changing times.

See also
 Canadian Pacific Railway Upper Lake Service, which operated the steamers Algoma, Alberta, Athabasca, Manitoba, Assiniboia and Keewatin

Notes

CP Ships